Downy, also known as Lenor in Europe, Russia and Japan, is a brand of fabric softener produced by Procter & Gamble that was introduced in 1960.

Lenor is a brand name of fabric softener and dryer sheets, also produced by P&G, sold in Europe, Russia and Japan. Lenor fabric softener had entered China in 2007 but was subsequently discontinued. Scent beads under the brand Downy have been sold in China since December 2017. Plans to rebrand Lenor as Downy in the UK were dropped in 2002.

For the company's national and international experience in sustainable development, and eco-friendly products, the Environment Possibility Award conferred the "Environmental Heroes of the Year" to Downy in 2012.

Amy Sedaris and Tituss Burgess are the talents hired to promote the Downy/Lenor Unstopables In-Wash Scent Boosters range in both the US and the UK. The commercials were filmed by Grey Advertising.

See also
Down feather
Downey

References

External links
Downy Official Site
How the Downy Fabric Softener Ball Works on HowStuffWorks.com

Cleaning product brands
Cleaning product components
Procter & Gamble brands
Products introduced in 1960